A Glitch in the Matrix is a 2021 American documentary film directed by Rodney Ascher. The film had its world premiere at the Sundance Film Festival on January 31, 2021, and was released theatrically and on digital platforms on February 5, 2021, by Magnolia Pictures to generally positive reviews.

Premise
Part science fiction mind-scrambler, part horror story, A Glitch in the Matrix is a multimedia exploration of simulation hypothesis – an "idea as old as Plato's Republic and as current as Elon Musk's Twitter feed" – through the eyes of those who suspect the world we live in is not real.

Cast
The following cast members feature in the film as themselves:
 Nick Bostrom
 Joshua Cooke
 Erik Davis
 Philip K. Dick
 Alex LeVine
 Læo Mystwood
 Paul Gude
 Jesse Orion

Production
The film was first announced on February 4, 2019, as part of the European Film Market, with Quiver Entertainment, then known as Kew Media Distribution, handling international sales. On December 15, 2020, the film was selected as part of the 2021 Sundance Film Festival lineup. The following day, Magnolia Pictures acquired worldwide rights to the film. Alongside the announcement, a teaser trailer was released.

Release
The film had its world premiere on January 31, 2021, at the 2021 Sundance Film Festival as part of the Midnight section. The film was then given a limited theatrical release on February 5, 2021, as well as a digital release via premium video on demand.

In its opening weekend, the film grossed $3,000 in the United States.

Critical reception
On review aggregator Rotten Tomatoes, the film holds a 68% Fresh rating, with the site's critical consensus reading "Although occasionally muddled, A Glitch in the Matrix is a thought-provoking portrait of digital culture and its relationship to reality." The film has an average score of 6.2/10 based on 98 critic reviews. On Metacritic, the film has a score of 62/100 based on 25 critic reviews.

Wendy Ide of Screen International called the documentary "fascinating, mind-expanding, infuriating, bewildering," and "bracingly ambitious" in a positive review. John DeFore of The Hollywood Reporter wrote that "though it leaves some avenues under-explored and gives a bit too much attention to the sci-fi landmark name-checked in its title, the film makes for engrossing, sometimes unsettling viewing" in another mostly positive review. Leslie Felperin of The Guardian gave the film 3/5 stars, stating that "what's missing from this fecund brew, which you could imagine being twice as long, is any kind of judgment or analysis of the subjects." Noel Murray from the Los Angeles Times wrote that "while the doc may be overlong, it's consistently fascinating because of its implications" in a mixed review.

References

External links
 
 
 
 
 

2021 documentary films
2021 films
American animated documentary films
American films with live action and animation
Documentary films about science
Films about death
Films about simulated reality
Films about the afterlife
Films directed by Rodney Ascher
Documentary films about conspiracy theories
2020s English-language films
2020s American films